Acacia johannis is a shrub of the genus Acacia and the subgenus Plurinerves that is endemic to a small area of north eastern Australia.

Description
Like most species of Acacia it has phyllodes rather than true leaves. It blooms in February and April producing simple inflorescences that occur singly or in pairs with flower-heads that contain 50 lemon-yellow coloured flowers.

Taxonomy
The species was first formally described by the botanist Leslie Pedley in 1999 as part of the work Notes on Acacia (Leguminosae: Mimosoideae) chiefly from northern Australia as published in the journal Austrobaileya. It was reclassified by Pedley in 2003 as Racosperma johannis then returned to genus Acacia in 2006.

Distribution
It has a limited distribution in far north Queensland around Mount Mulligan where it is known to form dense thickets. It is commonly situated on and among rock pavements and outcrops growing in sandstone based shallow rocky soils.

See also
List of Acacia species

References

johannis
Flora of Queensland
Taxa named by Leslie Pedley